Atomistic may refer to:

 Atomistics, the branch of science dealing with atoms
 Atomistic market or Atomistic competition, in economics; a market where no single player can affect the market
 Atomistic (order theory)

See also

 Atomism (disambiguation)